Françoise Pollet (born 10 September 1949 in Boulogne Billancourt) is a French soprano. She made her debut in 1983 at the Lübeck Opera as Marschallin in the Rosenkavalier of Richard Strauss.

References

1949 births
Living people
French operatic sopranos
People from Boulogne-Billancourt
Chevaliers of the Ordre des Arts et des Lettres
Knights of the Ordre national du Mérite
20th-century French women opera  singers